The Inforum is a convention center located in Irapuato, Guanajuato, Mexico.

It is the site of the annual ExpoFresas, which is held every December.  The Inforum consists of:

The Pavilions
Each has a  lobby. Each can accommodate up to 6,000 people for concerts, sporting events, conventions and trade shows. Both pavilions are connected by an outdoor multifunctional plaza with 645,835 square feet (60,000 square meters) of space. Pavilion 1 contains a mezzanine level and is the pavilion most often used for major events such as the aforementioned.

Centro de Espectaculos
The Centro de Espectaculos is an indoor arena used for concerts, sporting events, and other special events.  It was built as a Palenque with its center-stage measuring 71.78 square meters (772.5 square feet) Its concert capacity is up to 6,000 with 1,953 in chairback seats, five in handicapped seating, and the rest in benches.

Foro Abierto
The Foro Abierto is a 3,000-seat amphitheater which opened in 2013 and is used primarily for concerts and stage shows.

References

External links
Official website

Convention centers in Mexico
Music venues in Mexico
Buildings and structures in Guanajuato
Irapuato